Brooklands is an electoral ward of Trafford, Greater Manchester, covering the south-east of the town of Sale, including most of the Brooklands, Sale area. It is represented in Westminster by Mike Kane MP for Wythenshawe and Sale East The 2011 Census recorded a population of 10,434.

Councillors 
As of 2022, the councillors are Will Jones (Labour), Rose Thompson (Labour), and Chris Boyes (Conservative).

 Indicates seat up for election.

Elections in the 2020s

May 2022

May 2021

Elections in the 2010s

May 2019

Change in vote share compared to May 2015.

May 2018 

Change in vote share compared to May 2014.

May 2016 

Change in vote share compared to May 2012.

May 2015 

Change in vote share compared to May 2011.

May 2014 

Change in vote share compared to May 2010.

May 2012 

Change in vote share compared to May 2008.

May 2011 

Change in vote share compared to May 2007.

May 2010 

Change in vote share compared to May 2006.

Elections in the 2000s

Elections in the 1990s

Elections in the 1980s

Elections in the 1970s

References

External links
Trafford Council

Wards of Trafford
1974 establishments in England